Haeckel or Häckel can refer to:

People 
 Ernst Haeckel (1834–1919), German biologist, naturalist, philosopher, physician, professor and artist
 František Häckel, a Czechoslovakian cross country skier
 Stephan H. Haeckel, a management theorist who developed the idea of the sense-and-respond organization

Science 
 12323 Haeckel, a minor planet named after Ernst Haeckel
 Haeckel's Law, a version of the Recapitulation theory in biology

See also 
 Hackel